Chaerea is a monotypic genus of  cribellate araneomorph spiders in the family Dictynidae containing the single species, Chaerea maritimus. It was first described by Eugène Simon in 1884, and has only been found in Algeria, in Spain, in France, in Italy, and in Greece.

References

Dictynidae
Monotypic Araneomorphae genera
Spiders of Africa
Taxa named by Eugène Simon